Iason is a genus of beetles in the family Carabidae, containing the following species:

 Iason argonauta Giachino & Vailati, 2011
 Iason beroni Giachino & Vailati, 2011
 Iason fulvii Giachino & Vailati, 2011
 Iason karametasi Giachino & Vailati, 2011
 Iason paglianoi Giachino & Vailati, 2011
 Iason rossii Giachino & Vailati, 2011

References

Trechinae
Carabidae genera